Pentagon station is a station on the Washington Metro.

Pentagon Station may also refer to:
Pentagon City Station, a station on the Washington Metro
Chatham Pentagon bus station, a bus station in Chatham, United Kingdom